Perilous is the thirteenth studio album by American progressive rock band Glass Hammer, released on October 23, 2012 by Arion Records/Sound Resources.

This is the last album with Jon Davison acting as sole lead vocalist, with former vocalists Susie Bogdanowicz and Carl Groves returning on the following album.  The song titles, when read in sequence, form a short poem. It is the first album featuring Davison in which he was not involved in the writing process, as he joined Yes earlier in the year and was not available for the songwriting sessions.

As with previous albums Journey of the Dunadan or Chronometree, Perilous is a concept album. However band member Steve Babb stated "we have never done a concept album like Perilous. It is essentially one unified vision; one musical idea in thirteen parts or movements. The emotions and ideas expressed in the lyrics ebb and flow with the music; but they have a definite story to tell with a beginning, middle and climactic end."

Concept 
About the story of Perilous, Steve Babb stated "It should be obvious from the album art and the title Perilous that something dire is lurking just beyond that gate. Imagine two children lost in a cemetery at night and the unsavory characters they might meet as they try to find their way home. That is the setting for our allegory." However he stated that the listeners should interpret the ultimate meaning for themselves.

Track listing

Personnel 

Glass Hammer
 Jon Davison – lead vocals
 Fred Schendel –  keyboards, guitars, backing vocals
 Steve Babb – bass, keyboards, backing vocals
 Alan Shikoh – electric, classical and acoustic guitars

Production
 Steve Babb and Fred Schendel – producing
 Bob Katz - mastering
 R. T. Adolfo - cover artwork
 Julie Babb – administration

Additional musicians
 Randall Williams – drums
 The Adonia String Trio
 Rebecca James – violin
 Susan Hawkins-Whitacre – viola
 Rachel Hackenberger – cello
 Amber Fults - lead vocals in "In that Lonely Place"
 Carey Shinbaum - recorders, oboe
 Tim Wardle - additional backing vocals
 The McCallie School Guitar Choir (Bharath Venkatesh, Aaron Long, Ralston Hartness, Matthew Norris, Drew Shikoh and Charles Evans) - guitars
 The Chattanooga Girls Choir (Glory Larm, Laura Ayres, Brooke Pugsley, Kelsey Hodges, Katherine Stegal, Molly Stegall and Savannah Fanter) – choir
 Latin Choir (Stephanie Rumpza, Sarah Snyder, Kelly Luther, Dr. Thomas Hammett and Robert Waller) - choir

References 

2012 albums
Glass Hammer albums